The Denshway Museum is a museum in Al-Minufiyah, Egypt, 75 kilometers north west of Cairo, which was established to commemorate the Denshawai incident.

Establishment
The museum, which opened in July 1999, commemorates the Denshawai incident, a confrontation between British Army officers and local Egyptians over the officers hunting of local pigeons which the villagers grew for food. The museum honours the seven Egyptians who were hanged by the British on 26 June 1906.

Museum idea
In creating the museum, it was hoped to remind villagers of the history that helped to shape the region and also to provide a cultural center which would increase tourism in the region.

Museum design
The museum's design is that of an Egyptian pigeon tower, referring to the incident being sparked by British Army officers hunting pigeons for sport. The building has three levels, connected by stone spiral stairs. The museum includes a replica of the gallows, paintings and sculptures that tell the story of the incident as it unfolded, five exhibition halls and public space.

References

History museums in Egypt
Monufia Governorate